Ana Srebrnič (born 20 February 1984) is a Slovene chess player. She was awarded the title of Woman Grandmaster (WGM) by FIDE in 2006.

She was Slovenian women's champion in 2008 and 2012, runner-up in 2004, bronze medalist in 2005. In 2003, she won the 1st Mediterranean Girls Junior Championship in Ajelat, and took the bronze medal in the Mediterranean women's championship held in Beirut.

Srebrnič played for the Slovenian team in the Women's Chess Olympiad (in 2002, 2004, 2006, 2008, 2012 and 2014) the Women's European Team Chess Championship, the Women's Mitropa Cup and the European U18 Girls Team Chess Championship. She was on the team Slovenia 1 which gold medal at the Women's Mitropa Cup in 2009.

Srebrnič also holds the titles of FIDE Trainer and International Arbiter, which FIDE awarded her in 2014 and 2015 respectively.

References

External links

Ana Srebrnic games at 365Chess.com

1984 births
Living people
Chess woman grandmasters
Slovenian female chess players
Sportspeople from Ljubljana
Chess arbiters